The 1963–64 La Liga was the 33rd season since its establishment. The season started on September 15, 1963, and finished on April 26, 1964.

Stadia and locations

League table

Results

Relegation play-offs 

|}

Pichichi Trophy

External links 
  Official LFP Site
 Wildstat.com

1963 1964
01